Manuel Toledo (26 January 1880 – 22 June 1941) was a Spanish fencer. He competed in the individual sabre event at the 1924 Summer Olympics.

References

External links
 

1880 births
1941 deaths
Spanish male sabre fencers
Olympic fencers of Spain
Fencers at the 1924 Summer Olympics